士 may refer to:
Kangxi radical 33
士 shi, "yeoman", see Chinese nobility
武士 bushi "warrior", see Samurai

See also 
Plus-minus (disambiguation), for uses of the "±" sign